Jon Gallagher (born 23 February 1996) is an Irish professional footballer who plays as a forward for Major League Soccer club Austin FC. He can also play as a right-back or midfielder.

Early life 
Born in Dundalk in Ireland, growing up Gallagher also spent time in the United States, Jamaica, Singapore and England. While moving around, Gallagher played with Beachside SC in Connecticut, Home United in Singapore and England Schoolboys in England. He also spent time on trial with the likes of Juventus, Marseille, Newcastle United and Blackburn Rovers.

Gallagher played four years of college soccer at the University of Notre Dame between 2014 and 2017. In his senior year, he was named USC Second Team All-American, USC First Team All-South Region, First Team All-Atlantic Coast Conference, and Atlantic Coast Conference All-Tournament Team. Overall, Gallagher scored 39 goals and tallied 15 assists in 84 appearances for the Fighting Irish.

Club career 
Ahead of the 2018 Major League Soccer season, it was announced that Gallagher had signed a contract with Major League Soccer, making him eligible for the 2018 MLS SuperDraft. On 19 January 2018, Gallagher was selected 14th overall in the 2018 MLS SuperDraft by Atlanta United.

Gallagher made his professional debut on 24 March 2018, scoring two goals for Atlanta's United Soccer League affiliate side in a 3–1 win over New York Red Bulls II.

Gallagher was loaned to Scottish Premiership club Aberdeen from Atlanta United on 22 June 2019. The loan was initially for the remainder of the 2019 MLS season, but was subsequently extended to the end of the 2019–20 Scottish season. He played in 31 matches in all competitions for Aberdeen and scored his only goal against Rangers in a 2–2 draw on 4 December 2019.

Gallagher was traded to Austin FC in exchange for $225,000 in General Allocation Money on 13 December 2020, ahead of Austin's inaugural season in 2021.

Gallagher scored the first ever goal at Q2 Stadium for Austin FC on July 1, 2021. It was his first MLS goal. In 2022, he transitioned from winger to right-back and became a first team regular in this position. He scored his only goal of 2022 in a 4–3 comeback win against Sporting Kansas City. He scored the team’s second goal of the 2023 season in a 3–2 loss against St. Louis, coming off the bench.

Career statistics

References

External links 
 
 Notre Dame Profile
 

1996 births
Living people
Association football forwards
Association footballers from County Louth
Atlanta United FC draft picks
Atlanta United FC players
Atlanta United 2 players
Austin FC players
Irish emigrants to the United States
Notre Dame Fighting Irish men's soccer players
People from Dundalk
Republic of Ireland association footballers
Republic of Ireland expatriate association footballers
Soccer players from Connecticut
USL Championship players
Aberdeen F.C. players
Scottish Professional Football League players
Major League Soccer players